The 2016 NCAA Division III women's basketball tournament was the 35th annual tournament hosted by the NCAA to determine the national champion of Division III women's collegiate basketball in the United States.

Thomas More defeated Tufts in the championship game, 63–51, to claim the Saints' first Division III national title. While this was the second consecutive tournament win for Thomas More, the Saints' previous title from 2015 was vacated by the NCAA Committee on Infractions and does not count for official records. 

The national semifinal rounds were hosted by Capital University at the Capital University Performance Arena in Columbus, Ohio, while the national championship game was held alone at Bankers Life Fieldhouse in Indianapolis, Indiana, also the site of the finals of that year's Division I and Division II tournaments.

Bracket

Final Four

All-tournament team
 Hannah Hackley, Amherst
 Sydney Moss, Thomas More
 Abby Owings, Thomas More
 Michela North, Tufts
 Morgan Neuendorf, Wartburg

See also
 2016 NCAA Division I women's basketball tournament
 2016 NCAA Division II women's basketball tournament
 2016 NAIA Division I women's basketball tournament
 2016 NAIA Division II women's basketball tournament
 2016 NCAA Division III men's basketball tournament

References

 
NCAA Division III women's basketball tournament
2016 in sports in Ohio
2016 in sports in Indiana
Thomas More Saints
Tufts Jumbos